Today's Local News was a free, five-day-a-week broadsheet newspaper that covered northern San Diego County in California.

A rare modern-day start-up of a metropolitan broadsheet newspaper, Today's Local News was the attempt by Copley Press, owner of The San Diego Union-Tribune, to get full-market coverage in the prosperous North County region also covered by the Lee Enterprises-owned North County Times  and The Coast News. Copley began printing the new suburban paper November 4, 2004, delivering more than 75,000 copies free to homes from Tuesday to Sunday.

Editorially, the paper appeared to be a complement to the Union-Tribune and not a replacement. Its content is almost entirely local, with a concentration on community news and features rather than state and national affairs. One recent profile highlighted an Oceanside resident who works as a veterinary technician.

Since its launch, Today's Local News dropped Tuesday publication (going from six to five days a week) and, in October 2006, eliminated 26 positions. The staff write stories for the new paper that sometimes also appear in the North sections of the Union-Tribune.

Today's Local News has been a source of much controversy in the community, due to its practice of delivering its newspapers curbside, even when the previous day's paper has not been taken in.  Residents are unable to stop the delivery.  This has caused excessive littering throughout the service area, and has been a source of ill-will with residents.

The publication ceased distribution and closed on May 7, 2009, when it laid off its entire staff.

References 
 The San Diego Union-Tribune, September 13, 2006. "Free paper, U-T plan to consolidate" (Page C3). By Union-Tribune staff.
 San Diego Business Journal, October 11, 2004. "Copley set to make new N. County push"

External links 
 
 Article on Newspaper Closing

Daily newspapers published in California
Copley Press publications
San Diego County, California